Marallu may refer to:
 Marallu-ye Jafarqoli Khanlu
 Marallu-ye Kalbalu